Solms-Laubach was a County of southern Hesse and eastern Rhineland-Palatinate, Germany. The House of Solms<ref>See German article on the House of Solms or French article Maison de Solms.</ref> had its origins in Solms, Hesse.

 History 
Solms-Laubach was originally created as a partition of Solms-Lich. In 1537 Philip, Count of Solms-Lich, ruling count at Lich, purchased the Herrschaft Sonnewalde in Lower Lusatia which he left to his younger son Otto of Solms-Laubach (1496–1522), together with the county of Laubach. While Lich and Laubach were counties with imperial immediacy, Sonnewalde remained a semi-independent state country within the March of Lusatia (the latter being an immediate state of the Holy Roman Empire). A later Count Otto (1550–1612) moved to Sonnewalde and built the castle in 1582. In 1596 he also purchased the nearby Herrschaft of Baruth which was also elevated to a state country within the March of Lusatia. The branch then was divided into the twigs of Solms-Laubach, Solms-Sonnewalde and Solms-Baruth.

Solms-Laubach partitioned between itself and Solms-Sonnenwalde in 1561; between itself, Solms-Baruth and Solms-Rödelheim 1607; and between itself and Solms-Sonnenwalde 1627. Solms-Laubach inherited Solms-Sonnenwalde in 1615. With the death of Count Charles Otto in 1676, it was inherited by Solms-Baruth and recreated as a partition in 1696. Solms-Laubach was mediatised to Hesse-Darmstadt in 1806.

The counts of Solms-Laubach still own Laubach Castle and Arnsburg Abbey. Until 1935, Münzenberg Castle also belonged to the estate.

 Counts of Solms-Laubach 

 First creation: 1544–1676 
 Frederick Magnus I (1544–61)
John George (1561–1600)
Albert Otto I (1600–10)
Albert Otto II (1610–56)
Charles Otto (1656–76)

 Second creation: 1696–1806 
 Frederick Ernest (1696–1723)
 Christian Augustus (1723–84), with... Frederick Magnus II (1723–38)
 Frederick Louis Christian (1784–1806)

 Mediatized 

  Friedrich Ludwig Christian, 5th Count 1806 (Mediatized)-1822 (1769-1822)
  Otto, 6th Count 1822-1872 (1799-1872)
 Friedrich, 7th Count 1872-1900 (1833-1900)
 Otto, 8th Count 1900-1904 (1860-1904)
 Georg, 9th Count 1904-1969 (1899-1969)
 Otto, 10th Count 1969-1973 (1926-1973)
 Karl, 11th Count 1973–present (b.1963)
  August, Hereditary Count of Solms-Laubach (b.1994)
 Count Gustav (b.1965)
  Count Oscar (b.2008)
  Count Franz (b.1971)
  Count Friedrich (1902-1991)  Count Ernst (b.1939)
  Count Stefan (b.1976)
  Count Reinhard (1872-1937)  Count Hans (1927-2009)
  Count Georg (b.1972)
  Count Ernst (1837-1908)  Count Ernstotto (1890-1977)  Count Friedrich-Ernst (b.1940)
 Count Moritz (b.1980)
  Count Philipp (b.1985)

 References 

Literature
 Rudolph zu Solms-Laubach: Geschichte des Grafen- und Fürstenhauses Solms.'' Adelmann, Frankfurt am Main 1865

1676 disestablishments
States and territories established in 1696
 
Middle Hesse
1544 establishments in the Holy Roman Empire
1696 establishments in the Holy Roman Empire